The Town of East Fremantle in Perth, Western Australia was originally established on 2 April 1897 as a municipality with a mayor and councillors under the Municipal Institutions Act 1876. With the passage of the Local Government Act 1960, all municipalities became Towns effective 1 July 1961.

Municipality of East Fremantle

Town of East Fremantle

Notes
 Joseph Francis Allen died in office on 23 May 1933. John Munro was elected at an extraordinary election on 14 June 1933.

References
 
 Annual Reports of the Town of East Fremantle.

East Fremantle
Town of East Fremantle
Fremantle-related lists